Larry Marmie (born October 17, 1942) is an American football coach and former quarterback. He was most recently the defensive coordinator for the San Diego Fleet of the Alliance of American Football. Marmie served as the head football coach at Arizona State University from 1988 to 1991, compiling a record of 22–21–1. The 6'1", 195-pound Marmie played college football at Eastern Kentucky, quarterbacking at the school in the early 1960s after transferring from Ohio State.

He served as a senior defensive assistant for the Tampa Bay Buccaneers under head coach Lovie Smith until 2015. In 2018, he became the defensive coordinator of the San Diego Fleet, serving under Mike Martz.

Head coaching record

College

References

1942 births
Living people
American football quarterbacks
Arizona State Sun Devils football coaches
Arizona Cardinals coaches
Eastern Kentucky Colonels football coaches
Eastern Kentucky Colonels football players
Las Vegas Locomotives coaches
Morehead State Eagles football coaches
North Carolina Tar Heels football coaches
San Diego Fleet coaches
Seattle Seahawks coaches
St. Louis Rams coaches
Tampa Bay Buccaneers coaches
Tennessee Volunteers football coaches
Tulsa Golden Hurricane football coaches
High school football coaches in Kentucky
People from Barnesville, Ohio
Coaches of American football from Ohio
Players of American football from Ohio